Cautires is a genus of beetles in the family Lycidae.

References 

 Bocak, L. 2012: A revision of the Cautires obsoletus species group from Java (Coleoptera, Lycidae). ZooKeys, 241: 55–66, 
 Dudkova, P.; Bocak, L. 2010: A review of the Cautires obsoletus species group from Indo–Burma (Coleoptera: Lycidae). Zootaxa, 2527: 28-48

External links 
 
 
 

Lycidae
Elateroidea genera